The Special Loan Program for China-Latin America Infrastructure Project (中拉基础设施专项贷款) is a special credit line established by the Chinese government of US$20 billion for financing of infrastructure projects in Latin America. The program was announced in July 2014 during the inaugural China-LAC Summit with a commitment to implement the "special loans for Chinese-Latin American infrastructure".

The program is administered by China Development Bank and the capital is contributed from the State Administration of Foreign Exchange.

According to an analysis published on the China and Latin America blog, the program could be a source of financing for the Bolivian segment of the planned Central Bi-Oceanic railway, a project vigorously pursued by Bolivian officials in 2016.

References

Belt and Road Initiative